Discraft is a company that originated in 1978 in London, Ontario. It was started by a group of disc sport enthusiasts including Jim Kenner, Gail McColl,Chris and Mary Greenwood and Wallace Kenny. In 1979 Jim and Gail moved to Michigan and started what is now Discraft Inc. It was originally in Westland, Michigan, but is now located in Wixom, Michigan, a suburb of Detroit. They are a manufacturer of flying discs for the sports of Ultimate, Disc Golf and Freestyle. The company does not have any retail stores, but rather sells large quantities of discs to resellers and wholesalers around the world.
Discraft's 175-gram Ultra-Star disc is the only official disc that is USA Ultimate Championship Series Approved by the Ultimate Players Association.  Discs manufactured by Wham-O, Innova, and Daredevil Discs are approved for other levels of Ultimate competition. Discraft also owns and produces discs and other disc golf accessories for the company Disc Golf Association (DGA)

Products

Types of Discs

Currently, Discraft produces 48 different models of discs used for disc golf. Their production discs are divided into four categories. They produce 10 types of putters, nine types of midranges, 10 types of fairway driver, and 19 types of distance drivers.

Types of Plastic
Discraft discs are produced in nine different lines of plastics: (In order of retail cost)

Ti (Chemical symbol for titanium): The newest Discraft material (2012). It has the durability of Z plastic with grippiness of the ESP plastic.

Cryztal FLX Z: Z FLX is a new plastic that Discraft has released only being offered on a few models. It is speculated that this will replace the ESP FLX material.

ESP FLX Plastic: FLX is used on a limited number of discs. It is as durable as ESP Plastic, but much more flexible, this is achieved by adding a lightening agent to the ESP mixture. This type of plastic is extremely useful in cold weather conditions.

Cryztal Elite Z: Crystal plastic ranges from being more translucent than Elite Z to sometimes transparent. It often has glimmering effect when held in the light. Crystal is sought after by collectors for its beauty.

ESP Plastic: ESP plastic is a highly durable line that was launched in 2006. This type of plastic is made to be very grippy while also being very durable. ESP plastic is non-translucent.

Elite-Z Plastic: Elite-Z plastic is known for its durability. The plastic is semi-translucent, very stiff, and very resistant to wear. This line of plastic is produced in a variety of bright colours. This plastic is slightly more over stable than, for example the ESP Plastic.

Z-Lite: combines Elite-Z's durability and resistance to wear with lighter weights than possible with normal Elite-Z plastic.

Elite-X Plastic: Elite-X is very grippy plastic but is more prone to wear.

Pro-D Plastic is the cheapest type of plastic and is also the least durable. However, Pro-D plastic provides extremely great grip.

Soft Pro-D plastic is a variation on regular Pro-D plastic. It is only used for putters, and provides a more flexible, grippy feel.

Other Products

Discraft also sells a variety of disc golf accessories. The major accessories which they sells are disc golf bags, baskets, towels, and apparel. And also sells products pertinent to Disc Ultimate and Freestyle.

Team Discraft

Discraft sponsors a disc golf team called Team Discraft. Nate Doss, a member of the team, was the 2005-, 2007- and 2011-disc golf world champion.
Elite professionals such as Cameron Todd and Michael Johansen are also members of the team. Paul McBeth, a six-time world champion, joined team discraft beginning in 2019. Paul Ulibarri, who was previously with the sponsors, will be returning in 2019 as Team Captain. Eric McCabe and Paige Pierce are two former Team Discraft members that won world championship titles using the company equipment. On January 17, 2020, Discraft signed YouTube personality and former American Ultimate Disc League player Brodie Smith as he joined the Disc Golf Pro Tour. On February 24, 2021, Discraft extended their contract with Paul McBeth worth $10 million over 10 years. This is the largest professional disc golf contract ever.

See also 
 List of disc golf manufacturers

External links
Discraft

References

Ultimate (sport) organizations
Disc golf equipment manufacturers
Sporting goods manufacturers of the United States